Ethiopic Extended-B is a Unicode block containing additional Geʽez characters for the Gurage languages of Ethiopia.

Block

History
The following Unicode-related documents record the purpose and process of defining specific characters in the Ethiopic Extended-B block:

References 

Unicode blocks